Luis Ruffinelli (Villarrica, 1889 - Asunción, 1973) was a Paraguayan playwright, journalist and political activist. Considered one of the innovators of the theatre in Paraguay in the 1920s, he was director of the newspaper El Diario and founded El Debate in 1937. Among his works are La conciencia jurídica del barrio, and a comedy in three acts called Sorprendidos y desconocidos. In 1939, he wrote the drama Cuando Guerra for the Teatro Radial which was then headed by Josefina Plá and Roque Centurión Miranda. He also wrote Guanirino in the Guaraní language. His plays are written in Guaraní and Castilian, with dialogues often showing great political color. He was a deputy under President Rafael Franco and a member of the  Instituto Paraguayo de Letras and the Academia de Lengua y Cultura Guaraní.

References

1889 births
1973 deaths
People from Villarrica, Paraguay
Paraguayan people of Italian descent
Paraguayan dramatists and playwrights
Paraguayan male writers
Male dramatists and playwrights
Paraguayan journalists
Male journalists
20th-century dramatists and playwrights
20th-century male writers
20th-century journalists